Gregor Grilc (born 13 February 1970 in Šenčur) is a Slovenian former alpine skier who competed in the 1992 Winter Olympics and 1994 Winter Olympics.His best result in the Alpine skiing World Cup are  6th and 8th place, both in slalom. At the 1988 FIS Junior World Ski Championships, he won a gold  medal in giant slalom.

External links
 

1970 births
Living people
Slovenian male alpine skiers
Olympic alpine skiers of Slovenia
Alpine skiers at the 1992 Winter Olympics
Alpine skiers at the 1994 Winter Olympics
People from the Municipality of Šenčur